The Cowboy's Flute (Chinese: 牧笛, Mu Di) is a Chinese animated short film produced by Shanghai Animation Film Studio under the master animator Te Wei.  It is also referred to as The Cowherd's Flute and The Buffalo Boy and his Flute.

Background
The film does not contain any dialogues, allowing it to be watched by any culture.  The animation is essentially Chinese painting in motion, with a heavy emphasis on the flute melody.

Story
The story is about a young cow herding boy with an extraordinary flute playing ability, who is accompanied by his faithful water buffalo. The boy falls asleep in a tree, and is soon dreaming that he has lost his buffalo. The dream sequence is delightfully whimsical, beginning with falling leaves that turn into butterflies and gradually lead the cow herder to a beautiful mist-filled valley. Here the buffalo refuses to budge from his hiding spot, leaving the cow herder to find an alternate musical solution to his problem.

DVD
The DVD has been re-released as part of the Chinese Classic Animation Te Wei Collection set.

Awards
More than a decade after its completion, the film would win an award at the Odense International Film Festival in 1979.

References

External links
 
 The film at China's Movie Database

1963 films
1960s animated short films
Chinese animated short films
Animated films without speech
Films directed by Te Wei
1963 animated films